The NFL 1980s All-Decade Team was chosen by voters of the Pro Football Hall of Fame. The team was composed of outstanding performers in the National Football League in the 1980s. The squad consists of first- and second-team offensive, defensive and special teams units, as well as a first- and second-team head coaches.

Jerry Rice, Anthony Muñoz, and Lawrence Taylor were the only unanimous choices, being named on all 26 ballots. John Hannah was next with 25 votes, followed by Joe Montana at 24½ votes, Walter Payton at 23½ votes, and Ronnie Lott with 23 votes. The safety position was very close as Joey Browner made all decade second team as he came in with 22 votes. Kenny Easley got 22½ votes, just edging out Browner to make the first team. Easley of Seattle slipped between both in the voting as all three could have easily replaced the other in a very tight vote. Hall of Fame coach John Madden scoffed at the idea that Browner wasn’t a member of the first team, Stating “I don’t know how anyone in that room says Joey Browner isn’t the best safety in football!”  The overwhelming majority of NFL fans would likely argue that Ronnie Lott was the best Safety in the league during the 80’s; likely due to the San Francisco 49ers dominance during the 80’s, having won 4 Super Bowls. 

Walter Payton, John Hannah, Mike Webster, Ted Hendricks, Jack Lambert, Billy Johnson, Rick Upchurch and Chuck Noll had been previously named to the 1970s All-Decade Team. Jerry Rice, Gary Zimmerman, Bruce Smith, Reggie White, Ronnie Lott, Morten Andersen, Gary Anderson and Sean Landeta were also later named to the 1990s All-Decade Team.

Offense

Defense

Special teams

Coach

References

National Football League All-Decade Teams
National Football League records and achievements
1980s in sports
Foot
Foot
National Football League lists